Richard Geary (born 24 September 1963) is a former Australian rules footballer who played with Richmond and the West Coast Eagles in the Victorian Football League (VFL).

Geary came from Mitcham and played Under-19s football with Fitzroy. He transferred to Richmond without playing a senior game and made his VFL debut with his new club in 1985. A wingman and half forward, Geary spent two seasons playing for Richmond.

The West Coast Eagles later secured his services but he made just two appearances. He however performed well for WAFL club South Fremantle by topping their goal-kicking in the 1989 season, which ended in a Grand Final loss to Claremont.

References

1963 births
Richmond Football Club players
West Coast Eagles players
South Fremantle Football Club players
Living people
Australian rules footballers from Melbourne